OH-6 may refer to:

 OH-6 Cayuse, a U.S. military helicopter
 Ohio's 6th congressional district